Honey Run Covered Bridge was a wooden covered bridge crossing Butte Creek, in Butte County, northern California in the United States. It was located on Honey Run Road at Centerville Road, about halfway in between Chico and Paradise, until it was destroyed in the Camp Fire on November 8, 2018.

History
Built in 1886 and accepted as completed by the Butte County Board of Supervisors on January 3, 1887, the Honey Run Bridge (originally Carr Hill Bridge) was constructed by the American Bridge and Building Company of San Francisco. George Miller was appointed Superintendent of Construction by Butte County to oversee the project.

The three-span wooden bridge was originally built uncovered, as evidenced by the timber trusses of the two original, remaining spans covered with sheet metal on three sides. The cover was added in 1901.

Crossing Butte Creek, the Honey Run Bridge was the only surviving example of a three-span timber Pratt-type covered bridge in the United States. It was listed on the National Register of Historic Places in 1988.

The bridge was open to vehicular traffic until a truck crashed into the eastern span and damaged it in 1965, thus making the bridge virtually impassable.  A new steel bridge was built upstream for vehicular traffic.

The covered bridge was then used as a pedestrian footbridge, protected within Honey Run Covered Bridge County Park. Local residents raised funds and rebuilt the eastern span from the ruins, and the bridge re-opened in 1972.

It was destroyed by the Camp Fire on November 8, 2018. There is a possibility that Historic American Engineering Record documentation of the bridge could be used in its reconstruction.

See also
List of bridges documented by the Historic American Engineering Record in California
National Register of Historic Places listings in Butte County, California

References

External links

Honey Run Covered Bridge

1887 establishments in California
2018 disestablishments in California
Bridges completed in 1887
Bridges in Butte County, California
Buildings and structures demolished in 2018
Covered bridges on the National Register of Historic Places in California
Demolished buildings and structures in California
Former road bridges in the United States
History of Butte County, California
Historic American Engineering Record in California
National Register of Historic Places in Butte County, California
Pedestrian bridges in California
Road bridges on the National Register of Historic Places in California
Tourist attractions in Butte County, California
Wooden bridges in California